Comrades at Sea is a 1938 German war film directed by Heinz Paul and starring Theodor Loos, Ingeborg Hertel and Julius Brandt. The film is set during the Spanish Civil War, which it portrays as a Communist uprising against the lawful government.

Cast
 Theodor Loos as Konteradmiral Brackhusen
 Ingeborg Hertel as Inge, seine Tochter
 Julius Brandt as Großkaufmann Prätorius
 Carola Höhn as Carmita - seine Tochter
 Paul Wagner as Kapitänleutnant Rank
 Fred Doederlein as Leutnant Born
 Jaspar von Oertzen as Fähnrich z. S. Fischer
 Rolf Weih as Fähnrich z. S. Prätorius
 Günther Vogdt as Fähnrich z. S. von Raff
 Theo Brandt as Fähnrich z. S. Lutz
 Ferry Reich as Fähnrich z. S. Bern
 Josef Sieber as Oberbootsmannsmaat Reschke
 Heinrich Schroth as Kapitän der 'Marana'
 Angelo Ferrari as Legationsrat Matassi
 Reinhold Bernt as Kommissar Sakin
 Hans Kettler as Steuermann Martinez
 Ernst Behmer as Ober im Café
 Gustaf Dennert as Fähnrich
 Ellen Gutschmidt as Junge Tänzerin im Café
 Albert Hehn as Sailor
 Fritz Hoopts as Spanischer Fischer
 Charly Huber as Fähnrich
 Kurt Iller as Gefangener auf der "Marana"
 Arthur Kühn as Fähnrich
 Annie Lorenz as Offiziersfrau
 Josef Peterhans as Einer der Roten, die die "Marana" kapern
 Georg A. Profé as Fähnrich
 Gustav Püttjer as Fischer
 Arthur Reinhardt as Leutnant Feldmann, Offizier des Admiralsschiffes
 Maria Seidler as Anna, Wirtschafterin bei Brackhusen

References

Bibliography

External links 
 

1938 films
Films of Nazi Germany
German war films
1938 war films
1930s German-language films
Films directed by Heinz Paul
Films set in Spain
Seafaring films
Terra Film films
German black-and-white films
1930s German films